James Anderson Cringan (16 December 1904 – 1972) was a Scottish professional footballer who played as a wing half. He played 285 games in all competitions for Birmingham, including 261 Football League First Division games and an appearance at Wembley in the 1931 FA Cup Final, before trying his hand at management. 

He began his managerial career as player-manager at Midland League club Boston United, before becoming Banbury Spencer manager in 1936, a position he held until retiring in 1961.

Cringan died in 1972. He was the younger brother of Willie Cringan, captain of Celtic and Scotland. Another brother Robert played for Ayr United.

Honours
Birmingham
 FA Cup finalist: 1930–31

References
General
 
Specific

1904 births
1972 deaths
People from Douglas Water
Footballers from South Lanarkshire
Scottish footballers
Association football wing halves
Birmingham City F.C. players
Boston United F.C. players
Banbury United F.C. players
English Football League players
Midland Football League players
Scottish football managers
Boston United F.C. managers
Banbury United F.C. managers
Place of death missing
Douglas Water Thistle F.C. players
Scottish Junior Football Association players

FA Cup Final players